KBK could refer to:

 Grass Koiari language; ISO 639-3 language code KBK
 Karlsborgs BK, a bandy club in Sweden
 KBK Indian graphic news agency, Indian graphic news agency
 Keluarga Besar Purnawirawan, an Indonesian military veteran organization
 Kents Bank railway station, England; National Rail station code KBK
 Khamil Ghat railway station, India; Indian Railways station code KBK
 Klarenbeek railway station, Netherlands
 Køge BK, a football club in Denmark
 Kalahandi Balangir Koraput, a region in Orissa, India
 Kristiansund BK, a football club in Norway
 Kuurne–Brussels–Kuurne, a yearly bicycle race in Belgium
 Killer Be Killed, an American heavy metal band
 Karlstad BK, a Swedish football team